Kempe Glacier is a short alpine glacier in Antarctica, bounded on the north by Dismal Ridge and on the south by the Mount Kempe – Mount Dromedary ridge, whose chief nourishment is névé fields on the north slopes of Mount Kempe. The glacier drains northeast toward Roaring Valley. It was named by the New Zealand Victoria University of Wellington Antarctic Expedition, 1960–61, for its association with Mount Kempe.

References

Glaciers of Victoria Land
Scott Coast